Møinichen is a surname. Notable people with the surname include:

Claus Møinichen (1660–1726), Danish painter
Erik Røring Møinichen (1797–1875), Norwegian politician

Surnames of Scandinavian origin